Fuss Pot was a British humoristic comic strip which ran from 1971 until 2000.

History
Fuss Pot was first published in Issue 1 of the magazine Knockout, dated 12 June 1971. The strip was about a teenage girl with a pointy nose of the same name, who fussed about everything and everyone in her path. At one stage the full title was: "Fuss Pot, the Fussiest Girl of the Lot!"

Fuss Pot joined Whizzer and Chips in 1973 after Knockout merged into that comic, and became a Chip-ite. She then joined Buster in 1990 after Whizzer and Chips, in its turn, merged with that publication. Through the medium of reprints, the strip stayed with Buster until the end.

The strip was mainly drawn by Norman Mansbridge. He was replaced in the 1990s by Trevor Metcalfe, whose strips introduced Fuss Pot's cousin Scruff Pot. Artist Jack Edward Oliver included Fuss Pot on the last page of Busters final issue, revealing how all the characters in the comic came to an end. Fuss Pot's excuse was that she was too fussy to appear in the comic.

Sources

British comic strips
1971 comics debuts
2000 comics endings
Gag-a-day comics
Female characters in comics
Child characters in comics
British comics characters
Comics characters introduced in 1971
Comics about women
Comics set in the United Kingdom